Stević or Stevic (Cyrillic script: Стевић) is a Serbian surname.

It may refer to:

 Bogdan Stević (born 1987), Serbian footballer
 Dragutin Stević-Ranković (born 1979), Serbian former footballer
 Dušan Stević (born 1995), Serbian footballer
 Ivan Stević (born 1980), Serbian road bicycle racer
 Matt Stevic (born 1979), Australian rules football field umpire
 Miroslav Stević (born 1970), Serbian former footballer
 Oliver Stević (born 1984), Serbian basketballer
 Radomir Stević Ras (1931–1982), Serbian painter and designer
 Saša Stević (born 1981), Serbian footballer

Serbian surnames
Patronymic surnames
Surnames from given names